The Seoul Express Bus Terminal is the key bus terminal located in Seocho-gu, Seoul.

It is connected underground to both the Gangnam branch of the Shinsaegae department store and the banpo underground market, as well as containing its own share of stores.

as of September 2021, the third floor is abandoned spare a single sewing shop.

Routes

Express Bus

Transportation

Subway 
 Express Bus Terminal Station (and )

City Bus 
 Local Bus: Seocho 01, Seocho 10, Seocho 13, Seocho 14, Seocho 21
 Branch Bus: 3012, 3414, 4212, 4318, 5413, 6411, 8541
 Trunk Bus: 142, 143, 148, 351, 360, 362, 401, 406, 462, 540, 640, 642, 643, 740
 Rapid Bus: 9408
 Airport Bus: 6000, 6020
 Incheon Rapid Bus: 9500, 9501, 9502, 9510, 9800, 9802

See also 
 Central City

External links 
 
 https://moovitapp.com/index/en/public_transit-line-148-%EC%84%9C%EC%9A%B8%EC%8B%9CSeoul-1802-853691-247332-0

Bus stations in South Korea
Transport in Seoul